Lagoa da Canoa is a municipality located in the Brazilian state of Alagoas. Its population is 17,771 (2020) and its area is 103 km².

References

Municipalities in Alagoas